Choi Soo-min (also Choi Su-min, ; born April 12, 1981) is a South Korean former swimmer, who specialized in backstroke events. She won a bronze medal, as a 17-year-old, at the 1998 Asian Games, and later represented South Korea at the 2000 Summer Olympics.

Choi made her own swimming history at the 1998 Asian Games in Bangkok, Thailand, where she captured a bronze medal in the 100 m backstroke at 1:03.37, finishing behind Japanese duo Mai Nakamura and Tomoko Hagiwara by more than a full body length.

At the 2000 Summer Olympics in Sydney, Choi swam only in the women's 200 m backstroke. She achieved a FINA B-cut of 2:15.71 from the Asian Championships in Busan. She challenged seven other swimmers in heat three, including Hagiwara, Australia's top favorite Clementine Stoney, and Romania's Diana Mocanu, who later dominated the backstroke double at these Games. Racing against some of the toughest swimmers in her heat, Choi struggled to keep up her pace on the outside lane, and eventually rounded out the field to last place in a time of 2:26.42, the slowest of the event's heats. Choi failed to advance into the semifinals, as she placed thirty-fifth overall in the prelims.

References

1981 births
Living people
South Korean female backstroke swimmers
Olympic swimmers of South Korea
Swimmers at the 2000 Summer Olympics
Asian Games medalists in swimming
Swimmers from Seoul
Asian Games bronze medalists for South Korea
Medalists at the 1998 Asian Games
Swimmers at the 1998 Asian Games
20th-century South Korean women
21st-century South Korean women